The following is a partial list of spa towns in Bulgaria.

 
Spa towns
Bulgaria